HJ-10 (or "Red Arrow 10") is a Chinese ground-launched anti-tank missile developed by Norinco. It has a tandem high-explosive anti-tank (HEAT) warhead, that may penetrate  of conventional steel armour protected by explosive reactive armour.

Deployment
AFT-10, equipped on the ZBD-04A Anti-tank platform, is the ATGM version of the HJ-10 platform and it is the first one to be developed. Eight missiles and a retractable sensor mast is mounted on the ZBD-04, with sensors including a thermal camera, TV camera and a laser range finder. A millimeter-wave radar system is mounted at the front-right corner of the vehicle to improve all-weather operation capability.

Variants

AFT-10
The AFT-10 is the surface-to-surface variant in the HJ-10 family, receiving designation of AFT-10. AFT-10 is a fiber-optic wire-guided missile that equipped with ZBD-04 Anti-tank platform.  AFT-10 was first revealed in its deployment in Peace Mission 2014 joint military exercise.

Missile Specification:
Length (mm): 
Diameter (mm): 
Missile weight (kg): 
System weight (kg): 105
Max range (km): 
Min range (km): 
Search speed (m/s): 150
Attack speed (m/s): 250
g overload: 15
Guidance: fiber optic + MMW radar or fiber optic + ImIR

Mounted Platforms:
ZBD-04A AT: Eight AFT-10 missiles with sensors mounted on ZBD-04A chassis.
Type 08/VN1 AT: Eight AFT-10 missiles with sensors mounted on Type 08 (VN-1) 8x8 chassis.
CTM-133 AT: Eight AFT-10 missiles with sensors mounted on CTM-133 truck chassis.
CTL-181A AT: Four AFT-10 missiles with sensors mounted on CTL181A assault vehicle chassis.

Operators
: People's Liberation Army Ground Force — estimated 100 ZBD-04A ATGM Carrier in service as of 2020. Unknown number of other platforms.

See also
Anti-tank guided missile
Red Arrow Development
HJ-8 - wire-guided anti-tank missile system
HJ-9 - beam-riding anti-tank missile system
HJ-12 - man-portable infrared-homing anti-tank missile system
Similar weapons
AGM-114 Hellfire
Barq
Polyphem
XM501 Non-Line-of-Sight Launch System
 ALAS (missile)
Related lists
List of anti-tank guided missiles
List of missiles

References

Guided missiles of the People's Republic of China
Anti-ship cruise missiles of the People's Republic of China
Air-to-surface missiles
Weapons of the People's Republic of China
Anti-tank guided missiles of the People's Republic of China
Military equipment introduced in the 2010s
Norinco
Fire-and-forget weapons